Tonight! is an EP by alternative rock band Summercamp, released in 1997.

Track listing

Band members
 Tim Cullen - guitars and vocals
 Sean McCue - guitars and vocals
 Misha Feldmann - bass/backing vocals
 Tony Sevener - drums/backing vocals

References

1997 EPs
Summercamp albums